South Renfrew railway station, also known as Renfrew South railway station, served the Renfrew, Renfrewshire, Scotland, from 1897 to 1967 on the Paisley and Renfrew Railway.

History 
The station opened on 19 April 1897 by the Glasgow and South Western Railway. To the west was Renfrew Steel Works and to the east was Albert Cabinet Works. The steel works were served by a signal box called Porterfield, which was to the south and it opened before the station. Two replacement signal boxes were built when the station opened, which were named 'South Renfrew No 1' and 'South Renfrew No 2'. Also to the south was a yard which served the sidings for the works. The station closed on 5 June 1967.

References

External links 

Disused railway stations in Renfrewshire
Former Glasgow and South Western Railway stations
Railway stations in Great Britain opened in 1897
Railway stations in Great Britain closed in 1967
1897 establishments in Scotland
1967 disestablishments in Scotland